INID is an acronym for Internationally agreed Numbers for the Identification of (bibliographic) Data. INID codes are used by patent offices worldwide for indicating specific bibliographic data items on the title pages of patents and patent application publications.  INID codes use Arabic numerals, and so are language-independent. For example, number (30) indicates priority data, and (51) technical area according to the International Patent Classification (IPC).

INID codes are standardised by World Intellectual Property Organization (WIPO) in ST.9.

References

External links 
 ST.9 Standards section of the WIPO Handbook on Industrial Property and Information, which contains the INID codes

Intellectual property law
Patent law